Hirsh Zvi Griliches (12 September 1930 – 4 November 1999) was an economist at Harvard University.  The works by Zvi Griliches mostly concerned the economics of technological change, including empirical studies of diffusion of innovations and the role of R & D, patents, and education.

Biography
He was born in Kaunas, Lithuania in an assimilated Jewish family that spoke Russian at home. During World War II he was sent to the Dachau concentration camp. In 1947 he emigrated to Palestine, where he served in the pre-state Israeli army, learned Hebrew, passed high school equivalence exam, and studied for a year at Hebrew University.  He then moved to the United States, where he earned a B.S. in Agricultural Economics from the University of California, Berkeley, and then a Ph.D. in Economics at the University of Chicago, supervised by Theodore Schultz.

In his classic 1957 Ph.D. dissertation, Hybrid Corn: An Exploration in the Economics of Technological Change, published as an article in the October 1957 issue of Econometrica, Griliches demonstrated that the penetration of corn seeds followed the logistic curve. It was found later through multiple examples by Edwin Mansfield and other researchers that this is a general rule for technological change / diffusion of innovations. The dissertation was one of the first scientific works that treated the development of new technology as an economic phenomenon. Previously, economists had treated it as exogenous.

Most innovations either make production more efficient, or improve the quality of goods. The analysis of measurement of the impact of innovations on economics led Griliches to his fundamental studies of economic growth, productivity, production function, consumption function, measurements of economic input and output, hedonic prices, and their reflection in price indices.

Griliches also published important works of econometrics, including distributed lags (time series) and aggregation. He was particularly interested in the measurements of hidden variables.

Griliches served as the President of the Econometric Society in 1975, and as the President of the American Economic Association in 1993. From 1969 to 1977 he was one of editors of the journal Econometrica. He served on the Stigler Commission in 1961 and the Boskin Commission in 1996, both of which were convened by the United States Senate to evaluate the measurement of inflation.

In 1965, Zvi Griliches won the prestigious John Bates Clark Medal. He was elected to the American Academy of Arts and Sciences in 1965 and to the National Academy of Sciences in 1975. He was also elected Distinguished Fellow of the American Economic Association, Fellow of the Econometric Society, Fellow of the American Statistical Association, Fellow of the American Association for the Advancement of Science, and Fellow of the American Agricultural Economics Association. He died on November 4, 1999, in Cambridge, Massachusetts.

Memorials and tributes 
The Zvi Griliches Research Data Center was established in his memory at the Samuel Neaman Institute for Advanced Studies in Science and Technology in Israel. The Zvi Griliches Excellence Award was established by the Economics Education and Research Consortium (EERC) in Russia and other former Soviet Union countries.

The Zvi Griliches Research Seminar in the Economics of Innovation was held by the Barcelona Graduate School of Economics to promote interactions between academic researchers, innovation policy practitioners, statistical office analysts and PhD students with a general interest in analyzing technological innovation from an economic point of view.

In 2001, in the memory of Zvi Griliches, the International Advisory Board of the New Economic School, with the full approval of the entire NES community, decided to establish an annual series of lectures in economics. “The Zvi Griliches Memorial Lectures” are presented by leading scholars and open for everyone.

References
 Diamond, Arthur M., Jr. "Zvi Griliches's Contributions to the Economics of Technology and Growth." Economics of Innovation and New Technology 13, no. 4 (June 2004): 365–97.

Notes

External links
 Zvi Griliches' homepage
 Obituary published in the Harvard Gazette
 Obituary on the University of California website
 A Biographical Memoir by Marc Nerlove
 Zvi Griliches on Diffusion, Lags and Productivity Growth ...Connecting the Dots by Paul A. David
 In Memoriam: Zvi Griliches, 1930–1999 by Manuel Trajtenberg and Ernst R. Berndt
 A tree of Zvi Griliches's students, postdocs, coauthors, and their students
 Marc Nerlove, "Zvi Griliches", Biographical Memoirs of the National Academy of Sciences (2001)
 

1930 births
1999 deaths
20th-century American economists
Jewish economists
Econometricians
Jewish American economists
Jewish American scientists
Lithuanian emigrants to Mandatory Palestine
Soviet emigrants to Israel
Lithuanian Jews
Israeli emigrants to the United States
Harvard University faculty
Hebrew University of Jerusalem alumni
University of California, Berkeley alumni
University of Chicago alumni
Fellows of the American Statistical Association
Fellows of the Econometric Society
Presidents of the Econometric Society
Presidents of the American Economic Association
Distinguished Fellows of the American Economic Association
Members of the United States National Academy of Sciences
20th-century American Jews